Maharaja Bir Bikram Kishore Manikya Airport (IATA: IXA, ICAO: VEAT), which is used to known as Agartala Airport, is a domestic airport situated 12 kilometres (7 miles) northwest of Agartala, the capital of Tripura. It is administered by the Airports Authority of India (AAI). It is the second busiest airport in North-East India after Lokpriya Gopinath Bordoloi Airport in Guwahati and 29th busiest airport in India. It is the third international airport in North-East India, after Lokpriya Gopinath Bordoloi Airport and Imphal Airport. The new current integrated terminal of the airport has 20 check-in counters, six parking bays, four aerobridges, conveyor belts and passenger-friendly modern facilities and amenities like In-Line Baggage System (ILBS), Escalators, Lifts, etc. In addition to the new terminal building, a new parallel taxiway to the runway and two new hangars are being built. Another terminal will be built as an extension of the airport across the border with Bangladesh. This new terminal will serve Bangladeshis accessing the airport without having to enter Indian territory. This arrangement is worked out as similar to Cross Border Xpress Terminal of Tijuana International Airport in United States.

History

The airport was designed and built in 1942 by the then Maharaja of Tripura, Bir Bikram Kishore Manikya Bahadur Debbarman. It had one primary runway, 05/23, which is now used as a taxiway to Runway 18/36.
 
During World War II, the airport was used by the 4th Combat Cargo Group (4th CCG) of the United States Army Air Forces Tenth Air Force, flying Curtiss C-46 Commando transport aircraft over Burma.
 
The 4th CCG operated from the airport during December 1944 and January 1945, after which it moved to Chittagong.
 
The airport experienced international operations when Indian Airlines flew to Dhaka-Tejgaon Airport and Jessore in East Pakistan/Bangladesh from Agartala.

Development and expansion

Airports Authority of India (AAI) decided to upgrade the airport to international standards, which will be the third international airport in North-East region after Imphal. The AAI has undertaken ₹438 crore (US$61 million) project to upgrade the airport to provide world-class facilities. The State Government has already provided 72 acres (29 ha) land to AAI to build a new terminal building, runway and other necessary infrastructure. The upgrade is expected to be completed by 2025, out of which the new terminal is completed, and it was inaugurated by Prime Minister Narendra Modi on 4 January 2022. After becoming operational, flights from Agartala to Chittagong and likely to Singapore will be operated.

Proposal of Bangladesh expansion 
The Indian government has suggested leasing some land from Bangladesh in order to install perimeter fences and landing lights. The airport is often used by Bangladeshi travellers and if further utilised by Bangladesh, may be able to help relieve the heavy passenger and cargo traffic at Dhaka Airport. The Bangladeshi government is considering the matter; Bangladeshi FM Shahidul Haque compared the proposal to that of Geneva Airport, which is accessible from Switzerland and France. Ministers within Bangladesh's ruling Awami League suggested the only way such a proposal would be politically acceptable to Bangladesh is if a joint venture was proposed.

Airlines and destinations

Statistics

Accidents and incidents
 7 June 1970: A Fokker F27 of Indian Airlines flying with 34 passengers and 4 crew members overran the runway at Agartala after it touched down at a higher than normal speed 2,775 feet from the threshold; however, none of the passengers or crew members died. The airplane was later written off.

See also

 Airports in India
 List of busiest airports in India by passenger traffic

References

External links
 Maharaja Bir Bikram Airport at Airports Authority of India

Agartala
Airfields of the United States Army Air Forces in British India
Airports in Tripura
International airports in India
Airports established in 1942
1942 establishments in India
Buildings and structures in Agartala
World War II sites in India
Transport in Agartala
Proposed binational airports
20th-century architecture in India